The 1999 British National Track Championships were a series of track cycling competitions held from 23–31 July 1999 at the Manchester Velodrome. The Championships were organised by the British Cycling Federation.

Medal summary

Men's Events

Women's Events

References

National Track Championships